The 2015 Belarusian Super Cup was held on 14 March 2015 between the 2014 Belarusian Premier League champions BATE Borisov and the 2013–14 Belarusian Cup winners Shakhtyor Soligorsk. BATE won the match 3–0 on penalties and won the trophy for the fifth time.

Match details

See also
2014 Belarusian Premier League
2013–14 Belarusian Cup

References

Belarusian Super Cup
Super
Belarusian Super Cup 2015
FC Shakhtyor Soligorsk matches
Belarusian Super Cup 2015